Laura Ariana Chimaras Martí (born 8 May 1991) is a Venezuelan writer, daughter of the actor . The daughter of actor Yanis Chimaras, Laura rose to stardom as a teenager as the protagonist of the RCTV-produced drama Libres como el Viento. As the years went by, she acted in multiple novellas, movies, stage works and the television series Telemundo. During this journey, however, Laura went through a heart- breaking and life-altering event; she experienced her father's murder in Venezuela at the tender age of 15. Laura has authored five fiction books (originally in Spanish). These include her most popular book - Narcotic Passions, the Story of an Addict, Lost Words (My First Years in Letters), Never Lose Faith, and Setback: Memories, Time, Sequences. 
In her popular blog, Laura shares her musings on Liberty, Responsibility, Forgiveness and Love.Telemundo.

Television roles

References

1991 births
People from Caracas
Venezuelan television actresses
Living people